Weme may refer to:

Weme language, Fon language
Weme Province, old English name of Ouémé Department, Benin
Weme, old spelling of Weem, Perthshire
Weme, Minnesota
Weme (EP), by Korean girl group Weki Meki, 2017